Peter Hamm (27 February 1937 – 22 July 2019) was a German poet, author, journalist, editor, and literary critic. He wrote several documentaries, including ones about Ingeborg Bachmann and Peter Handke. He wrote for the German weekly newspapers Der Spiegel and Die Zeit, among others. From 1964 to 2002, Hamm worked as contributing editor for culture for the broadcaster Bayerischer Rundfunk. He was also a jury member of literary prizes, and critic for a regular literary club of the Swiss television company Schweizer Fernsehen.

Early life and education 
Hamm was born in Munich in 1937. His mother died in 1940, and he grew up with her parents in Weingarten, Oberschwaben, and in several Catholic boarding schools. He dropped out of school at age 14. He worked on a farm and began as an apprentice to be a bookseller, but did not complete it.

Career
His first published poems appeared in the literary magazine Akzente in 1954 when he was age 17 and in 1956  he was invited to read at the Gruppe 47. From 1959, he travelled to the GDR several times where he met authors such as  Peter Huchel and Sarah Kirsch. He met Paul Celan in Paris. He studied literature not at universities, but by means of direct communication with authors, including Nelly Sachs, with whom he corresponded.

Hamm worked for the publisher  from 1959 to 1960. He then was a freelance writer and journalist, publishing literary and music criticism in Der Spiegel and Die Zeit, among others. From 1964 to 2002, Hamm worked as Kulturredakteur (contributing editor for culture) for the Bayerischer Rundfunk. He wrote several television documentaries, including portraits of Ingeborg Bachmann, Heinrich Böll, Peter Handke and Martin Walser.

Hamm was a member of the Deutsche Akademie für Sprache und Dichtung from 1991, serving as its vice president, and of the Bayerische Akademie der Schönen Künste from 1996. He was a member of the German section of the Pen Zentrum. He was a jury member of the Petrarca-Preis, the Peter-Huchel-Preis and of the monthly Preis der SWR-Bestenliste, among others. He belonged to the critics team of the monthly Literaturclub of the Schweizer Fernsehen from 1990 to 2014. He received the Grimme-Preis in 1976 for Die verbotene Schönheit, a film about Hans Werner Henze.

Personal life and death
Since the 1970s, Hamm had been the partner of Marianne Koch. They lived in Tutzing.

Hamm died on 22 July 2019. A cause of death was not given.

Published works

Poetry collections 
 Sieben Gedichte, (cover: HAP Grieshaber). Stierstadt im Taunus (Eremiten-Presse) 1958

 Der Balken, Gedichte. Munich - Vienna (Carl Hanser Verlag) 1981
 Die verschwindende Welt, Gedichte, Hanser 1985
 Die verschwindende Welt, Gedichte, Frankfurt am Main (Fischer Taschenbuch Verlag) 1988
 Den Traum bewahren, Gedichte und Essays, editor: Gisela Lindner, Friedrichshafen 1989

Essay collections 
 Der Wille zur Ohnmacht, Munich - Vienna (Edition Akzente, Carl Hanser Verlag) 1992
 Aus der Gegengeschichte / Lobreden und Liebeserklärungen, Munich - Vienna n (Edition Akzente Carl Hanser Verlag) 1997
 Die Kunst des Unmöglichen oder Jedes Ding hat (mindestens) drei Seiten. Aufsätze zur Literatur., Munich - Vienna (Edition Akzente Carl Hanser Verlag) 2007
 Pessoas Traum oder: "Sei vielgestaltig wie das Weltall!" Aufsätze zur Literatur., Munich - Vienna (Edition Akzente Carl Hanser Verlag) 2012
 Ins Freie! Wege, Umwege und Irrwege in der modernen Schweizer Literatur., Zürich (Limmat Verlag) 2014
 Peter Handke und kein Ende. Stationen einer Annäherung.. Wallstein, Göttingen 2017,

Essay 

 Untröstlichkeit und Trost – eulogy for the recipient of the Herbert von Karajan Music Prize, Alfred Brendel, in Alfred Brendel zu Ehren, Warmbronn (Verlag Ulrich Keicher) 2009

Talks as books 
 Peter Handke / Peter Hamm: Es leben die Illusionen – Gespräche in Chaville und anderswo. Göttingen (Wallstein Verlag) 2006
 French edition: Vive les illusions! Entretiens. Traduit de l'allemand par Anne Weber. Paris (Christian Bourgois Éditeur) 2008
 Spanish edition: Vivan las ilusiones – Conversaciones en Chaville Y en otros lugares. Traducción de Eustaquio Barjau. Valencia (De la Presente Edición: Pre-Textos) 2011
 Thomas Bernhard / Peter Hamm: Sind Sie gern böse? Ein Nachtgespräch zwischen Thomas Bernhard und Peter Hamm im Hause Bernhard in Ohlsdorf. Frankfurt am Main (Suhrkamp-Verlag) 2011
 Spanish edition: ?Le gusta ser malvado? Trad. del alemán por Miguel Sáenz. Madrid (Alianza Editorial) 2013

As editor 
 Licht hinterm Eis – Schwedische Lyrik von 1900 – 1957. Auswahl und Übersetzung gemeinsam mit Stig Schönberg von Peter Hamm. Stierstadt im Taunis (Verlag Eremiten Presse) 1957
 Die Kornblumen und die Städte – Tschechische Poesie unseres Jahrhunderts. Herausgegeben und übertragen gemeinsam mit Elisabeth Borchers von Peter Hamm. Stierstadt im Taunus (Verlag Eremiten Presse) 1962
 Aussichten – Junge Lyriker des deutschen Sprachraums - vorgestellt von Peter Hamm. Munich (Biederstein Verlag) 1966

 Welches Tier gehört zu dir? Eine poetische Arche Noah – errichtet von Peter Hamm. Munich / Vienna (Carl Hanser Verlag) 1984
 Kennst du das Land, wo die Zitronen blühn – Italien im deutschen Gedicht. Herausgegeben von Peter Hamm. Frankfurt am Main (Insel Verlag) 1987
 Kritik / von wem / für wen / wie – Eine Selbstdarstellung der Kritik. Herausgegeben von Peter Hamm. Munich (Carl Hanser Verlag) 1968
 Spanish edition: Critica de la Critica. Barcelona (Barral) 1971
 Artur Lundkvist Gedichte, edited and with an epilogue by Hamm, Cologne – Berlin (Verlag Kiepenheuer & Witsch) 1963

 Peter Handke / Hermann Lenz: Briefwechsel. Mit einem Essay von Peter Hamm., Frankfurt am Main (Insel Verlag) 2006

TV film 

 Alfred Brendel, Pianist. Ein Porträt., book and direction, 45’. Radio Bremen 1973
 Alfred Brendel spielt Schubert. TV series in 13 sequences, music and image direction, Radio Bremen (Studio Hamburg) 1976–1977
 Heinrich Böll – Nobelpreisträger, book and direction, 60', from the series Nobelpreisträger, Bavaria Produktionsgesellschaft 1974
 Die verbotene Schönheit – der Komponist Hans Werner Henze, book and direction, 90', Westdeutscher Rundfunk 1976 (Grimme-Preis)
 "Der ich unter Menschen nicht leben kann". Auf der Suche nach Ingeborg Bachmann., book and direction, 120', Westdeutscher Rundfunk / SWF 1980.
 "Ich stehe immer noch vor der Tür des Lebens". Robert Walser und die schöne Kunst des Unterliegens., book and direction, 120', SWF/WDR 1986

Films 
 Die Moral der Ruth Halbfass, script, directed by Volker Schlöndorff, 1972
 Übernachtung in Tirol, script, directed by Schlöndorff, 1973

References

External links 

 
 Peter Hamm: "Das Zeitliche mit dem Ewigen verwechseln" (laudatio for Wulf Kirsten, in German) Evangelische Akademie Tutzing

1937 births
2019 deaths
Writers from Munich
German poets
German literary critics
Bayerischer Rundfunk people